Joseph Crane may refer to:

 Joseph Halsey Crane (1782–1851), attorney, soldier, jurist, and legislator
 Joseph Stephen Crane (1916–1985), American actor and restaurateur